The 1972 South American Open was a men's tennis tournament played on outdoor clay courts in Buenos Aires, Argentina from 27 November through 1 December 1972. It was held the fifth edition of the tournament and was a non-tour event, i.e. not part of the Grand Prix tennis circuit. Karl Meiler won the singles title.

Finals

Singles

 Karl Meiler defeated  Guillermo Vilas 6–7, 2–6, 6–4, 6–4, 6–4
 It was Meiler's only ATP title of the year and the 1st of his ATP career.

Doubles
 Jaime Fillol /  Jaime Pinto-Bravo defeated  Iván Molina /  Barry Phillips-Moore 2–6, 7–6, 6–2

References

External links 
 ATP tournament profile

South American Open (Tennis), 1972
ATP Buenos Aires
Buenos Aires
Davis
Davis